Oleg Pukhnatiy (born June 10, 1975) is an Uzbek former swimmer, who specialized in freestyle and individual medley events. He is a three-time Olympian (1996, 2000, and 2004), and a top 16 finalist at the 2002 Asian Games in Busan, South Korea.

Pukhnatiy made his first Uzbek team at the 1996 Summer Olympics in Atlanta. There, he failed to reach the top 16 final in the 200 m individual medley, finishing in twenty-fourth place with a time of 2:06.39. He also placed seventeenth, as a member of the Uzbekistan team, in the  freestyle relay (3:28.33).

On his second Olympic appearance in Sydney 2000, Pukhnatiy placed thirty-second in the 200 m individual medley. Swimming in heat three, he picked up a second seed by a 1.33-second margin behind winner George Bovell of Trinidad and Tobago in 2:06.01. He also held liable for an early takeoff in the  freestyle relay, when his Uzbekistan team had been disqualified from the heats.

Pukhnatiy shortened his program at the 2004 Summer Olympics in Athens, when he swam only for the third time in the 200 m individual medley. He cleared a FINA B-standard entry time of 2:07.49 from the Kazakhstan Open Championships in Almaty. Swimming in heat two, he edged out Chinese Taipei's Wu Nien-pin to take a fifth spot by nearly half a second (0.50) in 2:08.24. Pukhnatiy failed to advance into the semifinals,  as he placed forty-second overall in the preliminaries.

References

1975 births
Living people
Uzbekistani male medley swimmers
Olympic swimmers of Uzbekistan
Swimmers at the 1996 Summer Olympics
Swimmers at the 2000 Summer Olympics
Swimmers at the 2004 Summer Olympics
Asian Games medalists in swimming
Asian Games bronze medalists for Uzbekistan
Swimmers at the 1994 Asian Games
Medalists at the 1994 Asian Games
Swimmers at the 2002 Asian Games
Swimmers at the 2006 Asian Games
Uzbekistani male freestyle swimmers
Sportspeople from Tashkent